The Hanalei National Wildlife Refuge is a National Wildlife Refuge on the island of Kauai in Hawaii.  It is located within the Hanalei River Valley along the island's northern shore.  The Refuge was established on 30 November 1972 for the conservation of endangered plants and animals, especially the Hawaiian stilt, Hawaiian coot, Hawaiian gallinule and Hawaiian duck.

Geography
At the southeastern end of the Refuge, water from the Hanalei River is diverted into an east and west supply ditch.

Wildlife
The Refuge hosts five endangered waterbirds, the āeo (Hawaiian stilt, Himantopus mexicanus knudseni), alae kea (Hawaiian coot, Fulica alai), alae ula (Hawaiian moorhen, Gallinula chloropus sandvicensis), koloa maoli (Hawaiian duck, Anas wyvilliana), and nēnē (Hawaiian goose, Branta sandvicensis), as well as 18 other introduced bird species.

Public use
Refuge wetlands are closed to the public to protect the endangered waterbirds and taro crops.  Limited access is allowed along a county river road.  There are interpretive panels located at the Hanalei Valley overlook, across from the Princeville Shopping Center. A new overlook/visitor center is planned for an area adjacent to the refuge near the existing rudimentary overlook.

Hanalei National Wildlife Refuge includes the Hoopulapula Haraguchi Rice Mill, which is on the National Register of Historic Places.  A nonprofit association conducts historic and environmental education activities for local school groups and visitors under a Special Use Permit.

Notes

References

National Wildlife Refuges in Hawaii
Protected areas of Kauai
Wetlands of Hawaii
Landforms of Kauai
Protected areas established in 1972
1972 establishments in Hawaii